Presidential elections were held in the Dominican Republic on 16 May 1996, with a second round on 30 June. Whilst José Francisco Peña Gómez won the most votes in the first round, he was defeated by Leonel Fernández in the second round, after the Social Christian Reformist Party, whose candidate had lost in the first round, declared their support for Fernández. Voter turnout was 78.6% in the first round and 76.8% in the second.

Results

References

Dominican Republic
1996 in the Dominican Republic
Presidential elections in the Dominican Republic
Dominican Republic